KDC Racing was a Swiss auto racing team. KDC Racing was established in February 2018 by Monisha Kaltenborn after leaving the Sauber Formula One team, however the team rapidly went bankrupt.

History

KDC Racing was a partnership between Monisha Kalternborn and her business partner Emily di Comberti (who was previously known as Jean-Patrick Guy Phillipe Mourenon before gender re-assignment) with the name KDC being derived from the initials of their surnames.

Although the team competed under a Swiss license the team was based in Granollers, which is near to the Circuit de Catalunya.

Aaron di Comberti and Leonardo Lorandi competed in 3 rounds of the 2018 ADAC Formula 4 Championship and Aaron di Comberti, Ilya Morozov and Toby Sowery competed in 2 rounds of the 2018 Italian Formula 4 Championship.

Soon after commencing operations the team was declared bankrupt in the United Kingdom for debts owed to Lanan Racing for driver Aaron di Comberti's 2017 events with that team.

Former series results

ADAC F4 Championship

Italian F4 Championship

†Morozov competed for Cram Motorsport in from round 4 to round 6 and for Bhaitech in round 7.

Timeline

References

External links

Swiss auto racing teams
Auto racing teams established in 2018
Auto racing teams disestablished in 2018